The York Regional Police (YRP) is the police service of the Regional Municipality of York, Ontario, Canada. YRP was formed in 1971 from the police forces maintained by the nine municipalities which amalgamated into York Region at the time. The force had a strength of over 1,500 sworn members and 618 unsworn members as of 2015.

While YRP provides marine policing in the waters on Lake Simcoe, policing for Georgina Island (as well as Fox and Snake islands) is provided by the Georgina Island Police with assistance from the Ontario Provincial Police. The islands have had separate policing under Ontario First Nation policing since 1978.

History

The York Regional Police were formed in 1971, when the province forced the creation of a regional upper-tier municipal government that included the lower-tier municipalities of York County.

Prior to 1971, there were several police forces serving individual communities:

 County of York Constabulary
 King Township Police
 Vaughan Township Police
 Whitchurch Township Police
 Markham Township Police
 North Gwillimbury Township Police
 Georgina Township Police
 East Gwillimbury Township Police
 Town of Richmond Hill Police
 Town of Newmarket Police
 Town of Aurora Police
 Village of Stouffville Police
 Village of Sutton Police
 Village of Woodbridge Police

The YRP's motto, "Deeds Speak", is derived from the motto of the 3rd York Militia Regiment, many of whom also served as local constables in the Home District. The YRP crest is based on the crest from the former County of York government.

Command
The YRP's senior command consists of a chief of police and four deputy chiefs.

The head of the police service is Chief Jim MacSween who was sworn in as chief on May 1, 2020.  He replaced retired Chief Eric Jolliffe, after he served almost 10 years in the position. The administration and senior command are based at York Regional Police Headquarters in Aurora, Ontario.

List of chiefs of the York Regional Police

A list of chiefs of the York Regional Police since its creation in 1971:

 Bruce Allan Crawford 1971-1987, former Metropolitan Toronto Police officer, former Chief of the Toronto Harbour Commission Police
 Donald Hillock 1987-1992,  former Aurora Township Police officer
 Bryan Cousineau 1992-1997,  retired former Whitchurch Township Police officer;  charged with breach of trust during his time as chief
 Peter Scott 1997-1998,  acting chief after the retirement of Bryan Cousineau and former Metro Toronto Police Deputy Chief 
 Julian Fantino 1998-2000,  former senior Metro Toronto Police officer, chief of the London Police, later as Toronto Police chief, provincial commissioner of emergency management (assistant deputy minister) and former Commissioner of the OPP
 Robert Middaugh 2000-December 12, 2002,  34-year career police officer; former deputy chief in Halton, chief in Hamilton-Wentworth
 Armand P. La Barge December 12, 2002-December 2010,  former York Regional Police Deputy Chief and career officer with the force
 Eric Jolliffe December 13, 2010 – May 1, 2020
 Jim MacSween May 1, 2020 – Present

Operations

Operations are composed of:

 Administrative services
 Information services
 Investigative services
 Support services
 Community services
 Court services
 Emergency support (ERU and EDU)

Operating districts

The York Regional Police are divided into five geographical districts:

 1 District - 429 Harry Walker Parkway South, Newmarket serving:
Newmarket
Aurora
East Gwillimbury
King
 2 District - 171 Major Mackenzie Drive West, Richmond Hill serving:
Richmond Hill (including Oak Ridges, a separate urban section of Richmond Hill)
Thornhill (sections of Markham and Vaughan flanking Yonge Street)
 3 District - 3527 Baseline Road, Sutton serving:
Georgina
Lake Simcoe (patrolled by the Marine Unit)
 4 District - 2700 Rutherford Road, Vaughan serving:
Vaughan (except Thornhill)
 5 District - 8700 McCowan Road, Markham serving:
Markham (except Thornhill)
Whitchurch-Stouffville

Each district is headed by a superintendent and inspector.

Operational buildings 

 Whitchurch-Stouffville Community Substation, 111 Sandiford Dr, Whitchurch-Stouffville
The York Regional Police provide a substation to the community of Whitchurch-Stouffville. Numerous personnel work out of this substation to provide a police presence for the community. This community substation is supplied under the host of 5 District (Markham) resources.

 King City Community Substation, 2585 King Rd, King 
Shared with the King Township municipal offices, York Regional Police deploys personnel from the King City Community Substation to provide rapid and fluid policing services to the residents of King Township. The substation is supplied under the host of 1 District (Newmarket) resources.
 Community Safety Village of York Region, Bruce's Mill Conservation Area, 3291 Stouffville Rd, Whitchurch-Stouffville 
York Regional Police's Community Safety Village is a resource used by the service to teach young children about fire, traffic and personal safety. The resource includes a 10,000 square foot replica town with crosswalks, functioning traffic lighting and signals. Usually the resource is utilized by local schools, however, several family events are held at the location yearly.
 
 Community Resource Centre (collision reporting and customer service), 10720 Yonge St, Richmond Hill 
This site hosts the service's Collision Reporting Centre for collisions that occur of the southern municipalities in the region.  It also offers services that include Police Information Checks, Criminal Record Checks and several other services.

 Administrative Centre, 240 Prospect Street, Newmarket
The former headquarters for 1 District is currently under renovations to become an administration building. The building will host certain bureaus and their respective units that are currently operated out of Headquarters.

Marine unit
The marine unit consists of 11 full-time members and patrols the southern shoreline of Lake Simcoe and other York Region waterways.  It is responsible for approximately 350 square kilometers of Lake Simcoe and can service the entire lake if required.  The unit has seven vessels at their disposal and are deployed from the Marine Unit Headquarters located at 57 Lorne St., in Jackson's Point, Georgina.

Emergency support

Emergency support is a 23-member unit with an emergency response unit and explosive disposal unit.

Workforce

The service currently has an authorized strength of close to 1,700 sworn members and approximately 500 civilian staff.

Fleet

The York Regional Police are one of two forces in the greater Toronto area with an active air support unit (Durham is the other). While the Toronto Police Service does not have an air unit, York's air unit serves their area under a mutual support agreement.

The vehicles are numbered according to their District and car number. For example, 123 represents that the vehicle is from 1 District, and the following 23 is the vehicle designation number.

Other fleet numbering patterns include:

 ERU - Emergency Response Unit
 9XX - Road Safety Bureau
 DUTX - Duty Inspector
 CSXX - Community Services
 CTSX - Court Services
 PSUXX - Public Safety Unit
 MCPX - Mobile Command Post
 ASUX - Air Support Unit
 FIA - Forensic Identification Assistant 
 MARX - Marine Unit
 PDXX - Paid Duty Car
 K9XX - K9 Unit

Marked cruisers are labelled with the motto "Deeds Speak".

Three of the YRP's boats were named by Elder Barbara McDonald of the Chippewas of Georgina Island First Nation.

Uniform

Front line officers are dressed in dark blue (shirts, cargo pants (with red stripe) and boots), standard in most municipal police services in Ontario. Winter jackets are either black or reflective orange/yellow with the word police in white and blue at the back. Previously the service wore light blue shirts.

The uniform patch consist of the force's crest with wording "York Regional Police" on a black tombstone shape.

Auxiliary members wear the same uniform; lack of weapons, different shoulder patch and different hat band (black and red Sillitoe tartan) distinguish them from front line officers.

Officers wear standard forage caps and may opt for Yukon hats in the winter. Motorcycle units have white helmets. Black or reflective gloves are also provided to officers directing traffic. Red caps are used by search teams looking for missing persons.

Senior officers have white shirts and a dark blue dress jacket.

Crest

St. Edward's Crown
 Ribbon containing the words York Regional Police
 the escutcheon contains:
 The "deer stricken by an arrow" represents the original state of the country
 The "sheaf of wheat" represents the first progress in agriculture
 The "tree with an axe" represents the first act of improvement
 The "steam boat" represents the high state of technological advancement at the time

Flag

The YRP's flag consists of a nautical B signal flag with the YRP crest located in the white portion.

Ranks

The rank insignia of the York Regional Police is similar to that used by police services elsewhere in Canada and in the United Kingdom, except that the usual "pips" are replaced by maple leaves.

Police senior officers
The day-to-day and regional operations are commanded by senior officers:

Superintendent
Inspector

Uniformed non-commissioned officers
On-road enforcement and emergency response is supervised by:

Staff sergeant (field command)
Sergeant (district/area supervisors)

Investigative non-commissioned officers
Investigations are divided into crimes against persons and crimes against property.  These investigations are conducted by:

Detective sergeant (equivalent to staff sergeant)
Detective (equivalent to sergeant)
Detective constable

Police officers
Constable - first class (4+ years), second class (3+ years), third class (2+ years), fourth class (1+ years), probationary (less than 1 year)

Civilian members
Cadet
Special constable (court security officers) - special constables are sworn-in pursuant to section 53 of the Police Services Act which confers peace officer status. Special constables have the powers of police officers to enforce federal statutes and various provincial statutes while in the execution of their duties.
Station duty officers
Police communicators
Auxiliary constables (approximately 140 members since 2016) pursuant to section 52 of the Police Services Act, a chief of police can appoint auxiliary constables to act as volunteers. An auxiliary constable is not a peace officer but has the authority of a police officer only if he or she is accompanied or supervised by a police officer and is authorized to perform police duties by the chief of police.
 Fleet assistant - deal with maintenance of YRP vehicles

Communications

Communications is the branch of the York Regional Police responsible for receiving all 911 and non-emergency police calls.  Under the supervision of information services, police communicators are on duty 24 hours a day, 365 days a year.

The communications staff are non-sworn members of the York Regional Police, though the bureau is under the direction of an Inspector and a Staff sergeant.

Weapons

Emergency response unit

The emergency response unit (ERU) is the YRP SWAT team formed in 1980. The ERU is a group of specialized operators. The unit's primary mandate is to deal with high-risk situations beyond the safe operating limits of police officers with their normal equipment and training.  The ERU provides assistance during any high risk situations by performing the following;

Containment
Apprehension of armed and/or barricaded persons
Hostage rescue
Explosive forced entry
Explosive disposal
High risk search warrants
High risk vehicles/trains/aircraft assaults

In 1988 demand for the ERU was on the rise. Various operational obligations including the fatal shooting of an armed suspect by the ERU during a hostage rescue in Richmond Hill highlighted the need for additional members. In 1989 the ERU increased to 11 members.

In 2001 the York Regional Police established a shared service agreement with the Durham Regional Police Service, which allows for reciprocal tactical support in the event of large scale or long duration deployments. The York Regional Police provide tactical team and hostage rescue team support to the South Simcoe Police Service upon their request.

Following the September 11, 2001, terrorist attacks in New York City, increased awareness of terrorist threats provided the greatest single incentive for growth and investment of tactical teams in Ontario since the 1976 Olympics in Montreal, Quebec.

The ERU's roster was expanded in 2002 to an undisclosed number. The roster includes both snipers and explosives technicians.

The ERU has full explosive forced entry capabilities, which are mainly used in its hostage rescue and armed/barricaded operations. The ERU is regularly involved in high-risk search warrant services within the York Region and the Greater Toronto Area as well as a number of high-profile joint forces operations within Ontario.

The York Regional Police ERU conduct their own strenuous selection process, with the applicants mainly being from the departments' uniformed divisions. The unit also trains its own candidates in most required disciplines and is one of the founding members of the Ontario Tactical Advisory Body (OTAB).

Members of the ERU currently hold positions within the OTAB and Canadian Explosive Technicians Association (CETA) as well as membership in the National Tactical Officers Association (NTOA) and International Association of Bomb Technicians and Investigators (IABTI).

Traffic bureau

The traffic bureau was formed in 1989. At that time, the traffic bureau worked out of offices located at 200 Industrial Parkway South in the Town of Aurora. The traffic bureau was made up of officers whose primary function was to enforce traffic related laws. The unit was made up of six officers who drove motorcycles and marked police cruisers.

As time went on the unit began to specialize in the reconstruction of motor vehicle collisions. The unit expanded to approximately 20 officers working on four different platoons. The platoons followed the regular uniform officer shifts.

Collision reconstruction unit

On January 1, 2002, the traffic bureau was split into two separate entities, a traffic enforcement unit and a technical collision investigation unit (TCIU). The TCIU was made up of six officers on two separate shifts supervised by one supervisor.

In 2004, the technical collision investigation unit was renamed the "collision reconstruction unit". The unit had eight members made up of investigators and collision reconstructionists. The unit was still working with two shifts and each shift had a supervisor.

At present the collision reconstruction unit is made up of 10 officers. Two teams of four investigators and collision reconstructionists and a supervisor. The team members specialize in investigative techniques and collision reconstruction.

On December 15, 2003, York Regional Police's collision reconstruction unit investigated a collision on Rutherford Road west of Pine Valley Drive in the City of Vaughan that killed former NHL Chicago Black Hawks player Keith Magnuson. Rob Ramage, another former NHL player, was arrested and charged with impaired operation causing death and bodily harm, dangerous operation causing death and bodily harm, as well as over 80mgs. At the trial in the fall of 2007, Ramage was convicted of all the counts except the over 80mgs. In January 2008, Ramage was sentenced to four years in prison. He appealed his conviction and sentence. On July 12, 2010, the Ontario Court of Appeal upheld the conviction and sentence.

The members of the unit have received training in collision reconstruction, marine reconstruction and other related fields in Ontario as well as in the US

Enforcement unit

The enforcement unit is responsible for enforcement of all traffic laws. Officers from the enforcement unit perform breath tests and test drivers for sobriety utilizing standardized field sobriety testing and drug recognition experts. The York Regional Police's traffic bureau has trained over 100 frontline officers in the SFST battery and 15 officers trained as DREs

Officers from the enforcement unit utilize various speed measuring devices from hand-held radars and lasers to moving radar units in their police vehicles. Speed enforcement is conducted throughout the region. Special computerized ticket writing units are utilized in police vehicles to ensure there are no human errors.

The enforcement unit also instituted a prohibited driver program where officers investigate persons convicted of criminal driving offences whereby their driving privileges are revoked. Members use unmarked vehicles and conduct surveillance on suspects' home and court to catch violators.

The enforcement unit is known to have ticket quotas and unnecessarily handing out tickets. During the COVID-19 pandemic, York Regional Police officers wrote out tickets for expired licence plate stickers, despite the fact that the provincial government had extended the validity of these stickers indefinitely.

Emergency services

The York Regional Police are part of the York Region's emergency services and works with:

York Region Paramedic Services
Fire Services in York Region
YRT/Viva Special Constable Services

Community services

Bobby the Bear, Morris the Moose and Bucky the Beaver are the force's mascots and appear at various community events.

The York Regional Police also operates a variety of musical ensembles by permission of the chief. The York Regional Police Pipes and Drums, the Community Chorus, and Youth Band all represent the police force at parades, community functions and ceremonies.

York Regional Police Pipes and Drums 
The York Regional Police Pipes and Drums is a pipe band affiliated with the police service. Founded in 1988, it consists of serving members of the police force and the public. The band represents the police force at a variety of events where appropriate, including parades and community functions. The band also competes in local pipe band competitions in grade 4.

See also

Regional Police

References

External links

 York Regional Police
 York Regional Police Association

Law enforcement agencies of Ontario
Regional Municipality of York
1971 establishments in Ontario
Newmarket, Ontario